Alberto Alessi (30 May 1939 – 12 December 2022) was an Italian lawyer and politician. A member of the Christian Democracy party, he served in the Chamber of Deputies from 1981 to 1983 and again from 1987 to 1994.

Alessi died in Rome on 12 December 2022, at the age of 83.

References

1939 births
2022 deaths
Christian Democracy (Italy) politicians
Christian Democracy (Italy) members of the Chamber of Deputies (Italy)
Deputies of Legislature VIII of Italy
Deputies of Legislature X of Italy
Deputies of Legislature XI of Italy
People from Caltanissetta
Italian lawyers